Piotr Kula (born 23 May 1987, in Olsztyn) is a Polish sailor. He competed at the 2012 Summer Olympics in the Men's Finn class.

References

Polish male sailors (sport)
Living people
Olympic sailors of Poland
Sailors at the 2012 Summer Olympics – Finn
1987 births
Sportspeople from Olsztyn